The Rufus Barrett Stone House, also called the Flatiron Building, is a historic townhouse located in Bradford, Pennsylvania, in McKean County. It was listed on the National Register of Historic Places on November 14, 1982.

The three story brick structure was built in 1903 on a triangular plot of land between Boylston Street, Pennsylvania Route 346 (East Washington Street) and Tununguant Creek forcing the building to be designed in the distinctive clothing iron-shape.  It was built by Rufus Barrett Stone to house his law offices and his residence.

See also 
 National Register of Historic Places listings in McKean County, Pennsylvania

References 

Houses completed in 1903
Colonial Revival architecture in Pennsylvania
Houses on the National Register of Historic Places in Pennsylvania
Houses in McKean County, Pennsylvania
National Register of Historic Places in McKean County, Pennsylvania
Flatiron buildings